Sirajganj Stadium is a multi-sport stadium located by the Medical Assistant Training School in Sirajganj, Bangladesh.

See also
Stadiums in Bangladesh
List of cricket grounds in Bangladesh

References

Cricket grounds in Bangladesh
Football venues in Bangladesh